Diamond ring or diamond rings may refer to:

Diamond ring, a type of jewelry featuring a diamond
Engagement ring
The diamond ring effect, a feature of total solar eclipses
Diamond Ring (professional wrestling), Japanese professional wrestling promotion

Music
Diamond Rings (musician), an indie rock musician from Toronto, Canada
"The Diamond Ring" (song), a song by Adair
"Diamond Ring", a song by Bon Jovi from the 1995 album These Days
"Diamond Ring", a song by Pedro the Lion from the 1999 EP The Only Reason I Feel Secure
"Diamond Rings" (song), a 2009 song by rapper Chipmunk

See also 
"This Diamond Ring", a 1965 pop song
"This Diamond Ring", an episode of Dharma & Greg